Carlos Austin Boozer Jr. (born November 20, 1981) is an American former professional basketball player. The two-time NBA All-Star played for the Cleveland Cavaliers, Utah Jazz, Chicago Bulls, and Los Angeles Lakers, and then spent his last season playing overseas with the Guangdong Southern Tigers. As a member of Team USA, Boozer won an Olympic bronze medal at the 2004 Summer Olympics and an Olympic gold medal at the 2008 Summer Olympics.

Early life
Although born at a military base in Aschaffenburg, West Germany, Boozer grew up in Juneau, Alaska. He was one of five children of Carlos and Renee, both of whom worked two jobs as he grew up.

High school and college career
Boozer was a two-time member of the PARADE All-American high school basketball team, leading the Juneau-Douglas Crimson Bears to back-to-back state titles. He was recruited by many top-tier collegiate basketball programs, including St. John's and UCLA, but Boozer elected to play for coach Mike Krzyzewski at Duke University, helping the team win the 2001 NCAA championship.

In 2001–02, Boozer, Jason Williams, and Mike Dunleavy, Jr. each scored at least 600 points for the season, a feat only matched at Duke by Jon Scheyer, Kyle Singler and Nolan Smith in the 2009–10 season.

In April 2002, Boozer declared for the NBA draft, foregoing his final year of college eligibility.

Professional career

Cleveland Cavaliers (2002–2004)
Boozer was selected with the 35th overall pick in the 2002 NBA draft by the Cleveland Cavaliers. Boozer averaged 10.0 points and 7.5 rebounds per game in his rookie campaign, and followed it up with 15.5 points and 11.4 rebounds per game his second year.

Free agency controversy

After the 2003–04 season, the Cavaliers had the option of allowing him to become a restricted free agent, or keeping him under contract for one more year at a $695,000 salary. The Cavaliers claimed to have reached an understanding with Boozer and his agent on a deal for approximately $39 million over six years, which he would have signed if they let him out of his current deal.

Cleveland then proceeded to release him from his contract making him a restricted free agent. During this period, the Utah Jazz offered Boozer a six-year, $70 million contract that Cleveland chose not to match due to salary cap considerations. On July 30, 2004, Boozer officially signed with the Jazz.

Then Cavaliers owner Gordon Gund said, "In the final analysis, I decided to trust Carlos and show him the respect he asked for. He did not show that trust and respect in return." However, Boozer denied that he made any commitment to the Cavaliers: "There was no commitment. It's unfortunate how the turn of events went through the media", Boozer said shortly after signing the deal with Utah. "I'm not a guy that gives my word and takes it away. I think I've made that clear."

Utah Jazz (2004–2010)

In his first season with the Jazz in 2004–05, Boozer averaged 17 points and 9 rebounds per game. However, he suffered an injury, missing the later part of the season, which contributed to the Jazz missing the playoffs for only the second time in 22 years, and he was publicly criticized for a lack of effort by team owner Larry Miller.

As the 2005–06 season began, Boozer was still recovering from injury, and then aggravated a hamstring, causing him to miss the first half of that season as well. He returned to action in late February, easing into action by coming off the bench for the Jazz. In the middle of March, he was placed back into the starting lineup. From that point, he finished the season in impressive fashion, averaging over 20 points and almost 10 rebounds per game and firmly establishing himself as the Jazz's starting power forward once again.

Boozer got off to a strong start in the 2006–07 season, winning the Western Conference Player of the Week Award and helping the Jazz to win eleven of their first twelve games. Boozer was named part of the NBA All-Star roster as a reserve, but could not participate because of a hairline fracture in his left fibula.

In an April 23, 2007 game against the Houston Rockets (game two of the first round of the 2007 playoffs), Boozer scored 41 points, tying the career high he had set a month earlier on March 26 (vs. the Washington Wizards). He also led the Jazz past the Rockets in game 7 of the first round in the NBA Playoffs, scoring 35 points, grabbing 14 rebounds and two clutch free throws to secure the victory in Boozer's first playoff series.

The Jazz would go on to win their second round series against the upstart Golden State Warriors, 4 games to 1, and advance to the Western Conference Finals for the first time since 1998. Even though they lost 4 games to 1 to the more experienced San Antonio Spurs, Boozer proved valuable and durable. He ended the season averaging 20.9 points and 11.7 rebounds per game, and playing in 74 of 82 games. He was even better in the playoffs, increasing his output to 23.5 points and 12.2 rebounds per game, and appearing in all 17 Jazz playoff games.

In November 2007, Boozer was named Western Conference Player of the Month. By mid-December, he was among the league's top five performers in scoring, rebounding and field goal percentage. Although he later slipped in all of these categories, he continued to produce solid numbers. Boozer was again chosen as a backup in the All-Star Game, finishing with 14 points and 10 rebounds in just 19 minutes of play. He registered his first career triple-double against the Seattle SuperSonics on February 13, 2008, with 22 points, 11 rebounds, and 10 assists.

In the 2008 playoffs, the Jazz faced the Houston Rockets in the first round for the second year in a row. Determined to not allow him to beat them, the Rockets geared their defense more to stopping Boozer and his production was somewhat limited (16.0 points and 11.7 rebounds per game), but the Jazz defeated the Rockets, 4–2. In the second round of the 2008 playoffs, the Jazz lost to the top seeded Los Angeles Lakers in six games.

During the 2008–09 season, Boozer's ability to stay healthy was questioned by fans and media alike, as he missed 44 games following arthroscopic left knee surgery. He missed time from late November 2008 to late February 2009. When he played, his numbers were 16.2 points, 10.4 rebounds and 2.3 assists per game, in 37 games (all starts). With his possible pending free agency at the end of the season looming, it seemed likely Boozer would leave. However, when the deadline for choosing free agency or opting into the remaining year came, he surprised many by opting in for the 2009–10 season with the Jazz. The Jazz management stated publicly they were happy to have him return and play for them, and Boozer did the same.

In 2009–10, Boozer played well, averaging 19.5 points and 11.2 rebounds per game, and shot 56.2% from the field, a career high. He played in 78 of 82 games and avoided injury, which boded well heading into the 2010 summer.

Chicago Bulls (2010–2014)

On July 8, 2010, Boozer was acquired by the Chicago Bulls in a sign-and-trade deal with the Jazz.

Despite missing 23 games due to injury in 2010–11, Boozer still managed to average 17.5 points and 9.6 rebounds per game while also helping the Bulls get the first seed in the Eastern Conference. His production saw a decline the following year, as he averaged just 15 points and 8.5 rebounds per game (while playing in all 66 games). Boozer rebounded with a healthy, solid 2012–13 season, averaging 16.2 points and 9.8 rebounds per game while playing in 79 games.

On July 15, 2014, Boozer was released by the Bulls via the amnesty clause.

Los Angeles Lakers (2014–2015)
On July 17, 2014, Boozer was claimed off amnesty waivers by the Los Angeles Lakers. The Lakers paid $3.25 million of his $16.8 million salary, while the Bulls paid the remaining $13.55 million. On February 4, 2015, he scored a season-high 28 points in a loss to the Milwaukee Bucks.

Boozer's final NBA game was on April 15, 2015 in a 99 - 122 loss to the Sacramento Kings where he recorded 10 points and 6 rebounds.

Guangdong Southern Tigers (2016–2017)
On July 30, 2016, Boozer signed with the Guangdong Southern Tigers of the Chinese Basketball Association. On December 18, 2017, Boozer announced his retirement.

BIG3 career
On January 25, 2018, Boozer signed with the BIG3 league as a co-captain of the Ghost Ballers. He later was waived and was later picked up by 2018 Big3 champions Power.

NBA career statistics

Regular season

|-
| style="text-align:left;"| 
| style="text-align:left;"| Cleveland
| 81 || 54 || 25.3 || .536 || .000 || .771 || 7.5 || 1.3 || .7 || .6 || 10.0
|-
| style="text-align:left;"| 
| style="text-align:left;"| Cleveland
| 75 || 75 || 34.6 || .523 || .167 || .768 || 11.4 || 2.0 || 1.0 || .7 || 15.5
|-
| style="text-align:left;"| 
| style="text-align:left;"| Utah
| 51 || 51 || 34.7 || .521 || .000 || .698 || 9.0 || 2.8 || .8 || .5 || 17.8
|-
| style="text-align:left;"| 
| style="text-align:left;"| Utah
| 33 || 19 || 31.1 || .549 || .000 || .723 || 8.6 || 2.7 || .9 || .2 || 16.3
|-
| style="text-align:left;"| 
| style="text-align:left;"| Utah
| 74 || 74 || 34.6 || .561 || .000 || .685 || 11.7 || 3.0 || .9 || .3 || 20.9
|-
| style="text-align:left;"| 
| style="text-align:left;"| Utah
| 81 || 81 || 34.9 || .547 || .000 || .738 || 10.4 || 2.9 || 1.2 || .5 || 21.1
|-
| style="text-align:left;"| 
| style="text-align:left;"| Utah
| 37 || 37 || 32.4 || .490 || .000 || .698 || 10.4 || 2.1 || 1.1 || .2 || 16.2
|-
| style="text-align:left;"| 
| style="text-align:left;"| Utah
| 78 || 78 || 34.3 || .562 || .000 || .742 || 11.2 || 3.2 || 1.1 || .5 || 19.5
|-
| style="text-align:left;"| 
| style="text-align:left;"| Chicago
| 59 || 59 || 31.9 || .510 || .000 || .701 || 9.6 || 2.5 || .8 || .3 || 17.5
|-
| style="text-align:left;"| 
| style="text-align:left;"| Chicago
| 66 || 66 || 29.5 || .532 || .000 || .693 || 8.5 || 1.9 || 1.0 || .4 || 15.0
|-
| style="text-align:left;"| 
| style="text-align:left;"| Chicago
| 79 || 79 || 32.2 || .477 || .000 || .731 || 9.8 || 2.3 || .8 || .4 || 16.2
|-
| style="text-align:left;"| 
| style="text-align:left;"| Chicago
| 76 || 76 || 28.2 || .456 || .000 || .767 || 8.3 || 1.6 || .7 || .3 || 13.7
|-
| style="text-align:left;"| 
| style="text-align:left;"| L.A. Lakers
| 71 || 26 || 23.8 || .499 || .000 || .627 || 6.8 || 1.3 || .6 || .2 || 11.8
|- class="sortbottom"
| style="text-align:center;" colspan="2" | Career
| 861 || 775 || 31.2 || .521 || .071 || .722 || 9.5 || 2.2 || 0.9 || 0.4 || 16.2
|- class="sortbottom"
| style="text-align:center;" colspan="2" | All-Star
| 1 || 0 || 19.0 || .467 || .000 || .000 || 10.0 || .0 || .0 || .0 || 14.0

Playoffs

|-
| style="text-align:left;"| 2007
| style="text-align:left;"| Utah
| 17 || 17 || 38.5 || .536 || .000 || .738 || 12.2 || 2.9 || 1.0 || .3 || 23.5
|-
| style="text-align:left;"| 2008
| style="text-align:left;"| Utah
| 12 || 12 || 36.8 || .415 || .000 || .714 || 12.3 || 2.8 || .5 || .2 || 16.0
|-
| style="text-align:left;"| 2009
| style="text-align:left;"| Utah
| 5 || 5 || 37.2 || .528 || .000 || .771 || 13.2 || 2.2 || 1.6 || .4 || 20.6
|-
| style="text-align:left;"| 2010
| style="text-align:left;"| Utah
| 10 || 10 || 40.2 || .530 || .000 || .534 || 13.2 || 3.0 || .4 || .7 || 19.7
|-
| style="text-align:left;"| 2011
| style="text-align:left;"| Chicago
| 16 || 16 || 31.7 || .433 || .000 || .800 || 9.7 || 1.8 || .6 || .4 || 12.6
|-
| style="text-align:left;"| 2012
| style="text-align:left;"| Chicago
| 6 || 6 || 33.3 || .422 || .000 || .714 || 9.8 || 3.0 || .8 || .3 || 13.5
|-
| style="text-align:left;"| 2013
| style="text-align:left;"| Chicago
| 12 || 12 || 35.9 || .494 || .000 || .689 || 9.6 || 1.5 || .8 || .1 || 16.4
|-
| style="text-align:left;"| 2014
| style="text-align:left;"| Chicago
| 5 || 5 || 24.2 || .426 || .000 || .889 || 7.8 || 1.0 || .2 || .0 || 9.6
|- class="sortbottom"
| style="text-align:center;" colspan="2" | Career
| 83 || 83 || 35.4 || .483 || .000 || .726 || 11.1 || 2.3 || .7 || .3 || 17.1

National team career
Boozer was selected as a member of the U.S. Olympic basketball team, which won a bronze medal at the 2004 Summer Olympics. He was also part of the U.S. national team from 2006 to 2008, but did not compete in the 2007 FIBA Americas Championship due to his wife's pregnancy. Boozer participated in the 2008 Summer Olympics as the U.S. national team went unbeaten en route to the gold medal, defeating the 2006 World Champion Spain for their first gold medal since the 2000 Summer Olympics.

Personal life
Boozer is a Christian. Boozer has various tattoos about his faith including a Christian cross on his chest and the Bible verse Philippians 4:13 on his left forearm.

Boozer was married to his wife CeCe for six years before he filed for divorce in March 2009, (it was finalized in 2015). Boozer and CeCe have three children together: Carmani (who had a bone marrow transplant in 2007 to treat sickle-cell disease), and twins, Cameron and Cayden. Cameron Boozer is the number one overall recruit in the 2025 recruiting class.

He also has a younger brother, Charles, who played college basketball at Iowa State.

Boozer married his longtime girlfriend Aneshka Smith on June 3, 2017.

After leaving Duke his junior year to play in the NBA, Carlos Boozer was three classes shy of finishing his degree. In 2020, he officially graduated from 
Duke, and attended his graduation ceremony (two years later due to Covid) on May 8, 2022.

See also

References

External links

 
 Carlos Boozer at ESPN.com
 Carlos Boozer at FIBA.com
 Carlos Boozer at goduke.com

1981 births
Living people
African-American basketball players
All-American college men's basketball players
American expatriate basketball people in China
American men's basketball players
Basketball players at the 2004 Summer Olympics
Basketball players at the 2008 Summer Olympics
Basketball players from Alaska
Big3 players
Chicago Bulls players
Cleveland Cavaliers draft picks
Cleveland Cavaliers players
Duke Blue Devils men's basketball players
Guangdong Southern Tigers players
Los Angeles Lakers players
McDonald's High School All-Americans
Medalists at the 2004 Summer Olympics
Medalists at the 2008 Summer Olympics
National Basketball Association All-Stars
Olympic bronze medalists for the United States in basketball
Olympic gold medalists for the United States in basketball
Parade High School All-Americans (boys' basketball)
People from Aschaffenburg
Sportspeople from Lower Franconia
People from Juneau, Alaska
Power forwards (basketball)
United States men's national basketball team players
Utah Jazz players
21st-century African-American sportspeople
20th-century African-American people
American men's 3x3 basketball players